James Raymond Munkres (born August 18, 1930) is a Professor Emeritus of mathematics at MIT and the author of several texts in the area of topology, including Topology (an undergraduate-level text), Analysis on Manifolds, Elements of Algebraic Topology, and Elementary Differential Topology. He is also the author of Elementary Linear Algebra.

Munkres completed his undergraduate education at Nebraska Wesleyan University and received his Ph.D. from the University of Michigan in 1956; his advisor was Edwin E. Moise. Earlier in his career he taught at the University of Michigan and at Princeton University.

Among Munkres' contributions to mathematics is the development of what is sometimes called the Munkres assignment algorithm. A significant contribution in topology is his obstruction theory for the smoothing of homeomorphisms. These developments establish a connection between the John Milnor groups of differentiable structures on spheres and the smoothing methods of classical analysis.

He was elected to the 2018 class of fellows of the American Mathematical Society.

Textbooks

References

External links

20th-century American mathematicians
21st-century American mathematicians
American textbook writers
American male non-fiction writers
Topologists
Nebraska Wesleyan University alumni
Princeton University faculty
Massachusetts Institute of Technology School of Science faculty
University of Michigan alumni
Living people
1930 births
Fellows of the American Mathematical Society